This article lists the oldest  buildings in the state of Pennsylvania in the United States, including the oldest houses in the state and certain other extant structures. Some dates are approximate, based upon dendrochronology, architectural studies, and historical records. Sites on the list are generally from the First Period of American architecture or earlier.

All listed sites either date from prior to 1776, or are the oldest building in their county or large city, or are the oldest of their type (for example: churches, schools, firehouses, or government buildings).

See also
 List of the oldest buildings in the United States
 National Register of Historic Places listings in Pennsylvania

References

Pennsylvania
Architecture in Pennsylvania
Oldest